Curcuma zedoaroides, locally named in Thai as Wan-paya-ngoo-tua-mia, was first described by Chaveerach et al. in 2008. The plant is cultivated in the King Cobra Village of Khon Kaen Province, northeastern Thailand, where it is commonly used as a snake-bite antidote. Lattmann et al. (2010) and Salama et al. (2012) have published the antivenom activity of some phytochemical compounds isolated from plant rhizomes extract against Ophiophagus hannah (King Cobra).

References 

zedoaroides